Philbertia alba is a species of sea snail, a marine gastropod mollusk in the family Raphitomidae.

This is a taxon inquirendum.

Description

Distribution
This marine species occurs off Réunion.

References

 Fischer, P.-H. (1970) Gastéropodes testacés marins du Golfe de Siam. Journal de Conchyliologie, 108, 93–121

External links
 Deshayes, G.P. (1863) Catalogue des mollusques de l‛Ile de la Réunion (Bourbon). In Maillard, L. (Ed.) Notes sur l'Ile de la Réunion (Bourbon). Mollusques. Dentu, Paris, pp. 1–144

Raphitomidae
Gastropods described in 1863